Edmundo Bombase Cea (June 10, 1911 – December 30, 1993) was a Filipino politician.

Senator Cea was born in Tigaon, Camarines Sur on June 10, 1911 to Angela Bombase and Congressman Severo Fuentebella Cea. He was educated at Sto. Tomas University obtaining the degrees of Bachelor of Philosophy and Letters and Bachelor of Laws. He was a bar topnotcher in the bar examination of 1935. In college, he was Grand Alpha of the Alpha Tau Fraternity and also President of the University Student council. He was a World War II hero and considered as most outstanding fiscal of the country by obtaining 100 percent conviction in all cases prosecuted by him. He was the founder of the Bank Secrecy Law, the founder of Bicol Radio by founding the first radio station in Bicolandia. He was the founding President Of Bicolandia's only sugar milling company Bisuseco.

In 1949, he ran for Congressman to challenge the incumbent Congressman Caruso Moll who defeated his uncle former Senator Jose Tria Fuentebella, the first cousin of his father and he was elected to represent the Partido. He was a delegate of Partido in the 1971-72 constitutional convention where he was elected as majority floor leader. He was a member of the 1984-86 Batasang Pambansa and a member of the opposition bloc Apat Na Agila (Cea, Villafurte, Andaya and Alfelor). He was also the First Dean of the College of Law at the University of Nueva Caceres. Cea was considered as a brilliant legislator of his time. He started his political career in the Nacionalista Party and died as Nacionalista Party Chairman of Bicolandia.

References 

Philippines Who's Who (1957). By D.H. Soriano and Isidro L. Retizos

Members of the House of Representatives of the Philippines from Camarines Sur
Senators of the 4th Congress of the Philippines
Senators of the 3rd Congress of the Philippines
Nacionalista Party politicians
1911 births
1993 deaths
Edmundo Cea
Members of the Batasang Pambansa